High Falls Pond is a lake located by High Falls, New York. Fish species present in the lake are rainbow trout, white sucker, brook trout, smallmouth bass, rock bass, yellow perch, and black bullhead. There is a carry down on Old State Road, on the north shore.

References

Lakes of Lewis County, New York